Darren Mark Moore (born 22 April 1974) is a professional football manager and former player who played as a centre-back. He is the current manager of Sheffield Wednesday.

Born in England, he earned two international caps for Jamaica. Moore is also a member of the management committee of the Professional Footballers' Association. As a player, he represented Torquay United, Doncaster Rovers, Bradford City, Portsmouth, Derby County, Barnsley and Burton Albion. He also played for West Bromwich Albion, going on to serve as their manager between 2018 and 2019.

Early life
Moore was born in Birmingham, West Midlands, and attended James Watt Primary School and Holyhead Secondary, both in Handsworth. He played for Holly Lane Colts and in 1989 had a trial with Walsall.

Club career

Torquay United
He began his football career as a trainee with Torquay United in June 1990, and made his debut while still a trainee on 24 March 1992, in a 2–1 defeat at home to Birmingham City. He turned professional in November 1992. Moore began the following season as first choice in the centre of defence, alongside Wes Saunders and went on to play over 100 league games for Torquay before leaving to join Doncaster Rovers for a fee of £62,500 in July 1995.

Doncaster Rovers
Moore arrived at Doncaster with Torquay teammates Scott Colcombe and Duane Darby.  He appeared in the first game of the season, a home victory against Scarborough om 12 August. His first goal came in a draw at Barnet on 4 November that season. Altogether Moore played 84 games and scored 8 goals in his two seasons at Belle Vue.

His time at Doncaster wasn't easy as the club at that time was in the grip of owner Ken Richardson, who had been charged with attempting to burn the main stand down, something that had happened only days before Moore had arrived at the club. Financially the club was in dire straits and worse, Kerry Dixon, the manager, had said Richardson was picking the team not him. On the back of this, on 4 June 1997 he left for Bradford City for a fee of £310,000.

Bradford City
He played 18 times during his first season with injuries limiting his starts. But in 1998–99 he started 44 games helping City to promotion into the Premier League for the first time. During the summer he refused to sign a new contract and fell out of favour with manager Paul Jewell. He played just once more for Bradford, in the League Cup against Reading.

Portsmouth
Portsmouth snatched his services from a collection of other suitors, for a fee of £500,000, in November 1999. He spent less than two years at Fratton Park before returning to the West Midlands with West Bromwich Albion for a fee of £750,000 on 14 September 2001.

West Bromwich Albion
The following day he made his Albion debut, as a second-half substitute in a 2–1 win at Watford. Moore proved to be a rock at the heart of the Baggies defence as they earned promotion to the Premier League in 2001–02, and was named in the PFA Team of the Year for the First Division. After Albion were relegated from the top flight, he helped them bounce back at the first attempt, figuring in the promotion winning side of 2003–04.

Moore struggled to hold down a regular first team place during the first half of the 2005–06 season. He was sent off in the match against Wigan Athletic on 15 January 2006, his only dismissal in over 100 games for Albion. It proved to be his last game for the club, and later that month he was signed for Derby County by Phil Brown for a fee of £300,000, rising to £500,000 depending on appearances.

Derby County

Moore was a pivotal figure in the 2006–07 Derby side that clinched promotion back to the Premier League after a five-year absence by winning the Championship play-off final 1–0 against his former club West Brom. This was the fourth time he had been part of a squad which won promotion to the Premier League, following on from his successes at West Brom (twice) and Bradford. His form that year led to him being named in the PFA Team of the Year for the 2006–07 Championship. In the 2007–08 Premiership season, Derby were relegated as the bottom club, although Moore was awarded the club's internal Player of the Season award. Following the club's relegation, manager Paul Jewell allowed Moore to talk to his former club Bradford City, who were managed by his former teammates Stuart McCall and Wayne Jacobs as assistant. However, Bradford City decided not to pursue their interest in Moore, instead opting to sign Graeme Lee.

Barnsley
Moore signed for Barnsley on 2 July 2008. Barnsley manager Simon Davey said they beat off competition from several sides to land the experienced defender. He scored his first goal for the club on 1 November 2008, with a header in a 3–1 win against Charlton Athletic. He scored his second goal for the club on 17 April 2010 against Swansea City. On 2 May 2010, after the West Bromwich Albion game, Moore was released by Barnsley.

Burton Albion
Moore signed for Burton Albion on 7 May 2010, days after his release from Barnsley, rejecting offers from higher-level clubs. On 3 August 2010, he was announced as the club's new captain, replacing Darren Stride. Moore left the club on 7 February 2012. He then played for a while for Wellington Amateurs, before returning to his old club West Brom, employed as a youth coach.

International career
Moore made two appearances for the Jamaica national team from 1999 to 2000.

Managerial career

West Bromwich Albion
On 2 April 2018, West Bromwich Albion manager Alan Pardew, was dismissed from his post after a run of poor results, leaving them bottom of the Premier League and ten points from safety. Moore was then appointed as caretaker manager, taking charge of all current first team affairs until the end of the season. This made him the first ever Jamaican to manage in the Premier League. Under his leadership, West Brom went undefeated in April, a run that included a 1–0 away win against Manchester United – handing the league title to United's arch-rivals Manchester City, in part earning Moore the Premier League Manager of the Month honour. However, West Brom were relegated from the Premier League later that day following Southampton's win against Swansea City, ending the club's eight-year tenure in the top-flight.

On 18 May 2018, Moore was appointed as the permanent head coach of West Bromwich Albion, after impressing during his caretaker spell with the Baggies. The Baggies began the new Championship season as firm favourites for promotion, and by Moore's time of departure, were sat in fourth place and in contention for qualification for the play-offs. On 9 March 2019, Moore was sacked by the club, after a negative string of home results. James Shan temporarily replaced Moore in caretaker charge, leading them to the play-off semi-finals against eventual winners Aston Villa, suffering defeat. Slaven Bilić was appointed as Moore's permanent successor in June 2019.

Doncaster Rovers
Moore returned to management during the summer, after agreeing to replace Grant McCann as the manager of League One side Doncaster Rovers. Moore's reign in charge began well, as they maintained a six-game undefeated streak, prior to losing 1–0 against Blackpool.

As a result of the COVID-19 pandemic, all football and other sporting competitions were halted from March 2020 onwards. On 9 June, all clubs voted to curtail the season, meaning the final league table would be calculated by a points-per-game method; Doncaster narrowly missed out on play-off qualification, finishing the season in ninth position.

In October 2020, when Gerhard Struber left Moore's former playing side Barnsley, Moore immediately became the favourite to replace him as their new manager, which would have seen him return to the Championship after a year-long absence, though it was Valérien Ismaël who was appointed as Struber's replacement. That season saw Moore's side regain significant form, which saw the manager nominated for the division's Manager of the Month accolade for both September 2020 and January 2021.

After going through the entirety of January 2021 winning every single league match possible, towards the end of his reign as manager, Moore's side went five games without securing a victory, losing his final match in charge by 2–1 to Ipswich Town.

Sheffield Wednesday
On 1 March 2021, Moore left Doncaster with the club in the League One play-off positions to join Sheffield Wednesday, sitting inside the Championship relegation zone. His first game in charge would be at home to Rotherham United, where they would eventually lose to a 10-man Rotherham, thanks to a 90+7 minute, stoppage time winner from Freddie Ladapo. He would lose the following two games against Reading and Norwich City, but would pick up his first point in a 1-1 draw with Huddersfield Town. On 20 March, he would pick up his first win in the local derby against Barnsley winning the game 2-1, thanks to two Jordan Rhodes goals. Prior to the game against Watford on 2 April 2021, it was announced that he wouldn’t be in the dugout due to a positive Covid-19 test and would subsequently miss the games against Cardiff City and Queens Park Rangers. He would return to the dugout for the defeat against Swansea City, but he would suffer a setback a few days later in his recovery, developing pneumonia as a result of Covid-19. He would return to the dugout for the final game of the season and must win tie against Derby County on 8 May 2021. The game would finish 3-3 and would see Sheffield Wednesday relegated back to League One and finish in last place. After the match, Sheffield Wednesday owner Dejphon Chansiri confirmed that manager Darren Moore would remain manager for the following season.

The following season would see Darren Moore nominated for November Manager of the Month following 11 points and 11 goals in five unbeaten games. He would receive another nomination for the month of February too, winning five of their six games - four of them by a two-goal margin - to move into the play-off picture. Moore would lead his side to the play-offs by earning 16 points from the final 21 available, getting himself his third and final nomination for EFL Manager of the Month for the 2021-22 season. In the play-offs they would fall short losing 2-1 to Sunderland over two legs, but would finish his first full season as manager with 85 points.

After failing in the playoffs the previous season, he would kick off the following season in great form, four wins from five games with a clean sheet in each gave him a manager of the month nomination for August. Getting 14 points from 7 games in October and 6 points from 2 in November would see him get back-to-back EFL Manager of the Month nominations for October and November. Another 9 points in January from 3 games with a combined 7-0 win, would give him another nomination for January.

Personal life
At West Brom he has been known by supporters as "Big Dave".

Moore is a devout Christian. He is active in the Christian charity Faith and Football with Linvoy Primus and Lomana LuaLua and has described the two as his best friends. In 2005, Moore, along with Primus, walked the Great Wall of China to raise money for children's causes. He has raised thousands of pounds for Christian Aid and Oxfam and started to raise awareness about helping children in third-world countries. Moore and Primus have organised another charity bicycle ride from Charlton to Portsmouth, via Barnet and Reading, all clubs where Primus played, to raise money for the Faith and Football charity. In 2004, Moore received an award for 'Outstanding Contribution to Grass Roots and Community Football Projects' as part of the Professional Footballers' Association's 'Let's Kick Racism Out of Football' campaign.

Playing statistics

Club

International

Managerial statistics

Honours

Player
Individual
PFA Team of the Year: 1998–99 First Division, 2001–02 First Division, 2006–07 Championship

Manager
Individual
Premier League Manager of the Month: April 2018
EFL Championship Manager of the Month: September 2018

References

External links

Darren Moores Faith and Football page
Darren Moore Official Website at Icons.com

Profile on The Official Reggae Boyz Supporterz Club website

1974 births
Living people
Footballers from Birmingham, West Midlands
English footballers
Jamaican footballers
Jamaica international footballers
Association football defenders
Torquay United F.C. players
Doncaster Rovers F.C. players
Bradford City A.F.C. players
Portsmouth F.C. players
West Bromwich Albion F.C. players
Derby County F.C. players
Barnsley F.C. players
Burton Albion F.C. players
Premier League players
English Football League players
English football managers
Jamaican football managers
West Bromwich Albion F.C. managers
Doncaster Rovers F.C. managers
Sheffield Wednesday F.C. managers
Premier League managers
Association football coaches
Blackburn Rovers F.C. non-playing staff
West Bromwich Albion F.C. non-playing staff
English Christians
English people of Jamaican descent
Black British sportsmen